Sherwin Stowers (born 19 May 1986) is a New Zealand former rugby player. He played for the Blues Super Rugby side, for whom he made 11 appearances following his 2011 debut. He also played for Counties Manukau in the New Zealand Provincial ITM Cup.

Stowers played for the New Zealand national rugby sevens team in the Sevens World Series. He played at the 2010 and 2014 Commonwealth Games. He announced his retirement from professional rugby in 2017.

References

External links
 Counties Manukau profile
 

1986 births
New Zealand rugby union players
New Zealand Māori rugby union players
Blues (Super Rugby) players
Counties Manukau rugby union players
Rugby union wings
Living people
Rugby union players from Auckland
People educated at De La Salle College, Māngere East
New Zealand international rugby sevens players
Commonwealth Games rugby sevens players of New Zealand
Commonwealth Games gold medallists for New Zealand
Rugby sevens players at the 2010 Commonwealth Games
Rugby sevens players at the 2014 Commonwealth Games
Commonwealth Games medallists in rugby sevens
Commonwealth Games silver medallists for New Zealand
Medallists at the 2010 Commonwealth Games
Medallists at the 2014 Commonwealth Games